The West Side community is the oldest Jewish community in Denver, Colorado.  It is a traditional, Haredi community with its own eruv.   The community follows Ashkenazi Jewish traditions as set forth by the Litvak Jewish tradition, that of Lithuanian Judaism.

Life in the community is centered on the Denver Community Kollel,  Congregation Zera Avraham, Yeshiva Toras Chaim, and Beth Jacob (Bais Yaakov) High School of Denver.

History
The West Colfax neighborhood of Denver was a predominantly Jewish area from the 1920s to the 1950s, as reflected in its residential population, a thriving business community that included kosher markets and other businesses serving Jewish customers, and its cultural facilities. Golda Meir, who later became the fourth Prime Minister of Israel, lived in the "West Side" neighborhood as a teenager. Her family's home at 1606 Julian Street was restored and moved to the Auraria Campus in Downtown Denver.

The area's history is reflected by the continuing presence of a significant amount of its Jewish cultural character and institutions.

Eruv
The West Denver eruv is recognized by city ordinance, and its boundaries are marked by special wires strung from utility poles. These boundaries define a walkable zone in which Jews who observe the traditional rules concerning the Sabbath can congregate and socialize on the Sabbath without breaking those rules.

Notable people
 Golda Meir, former Prime Minister of Israel

References

Ashkenazi Jewish culture in the United States
European American culture in Colorado
Haredi Judaism in the United States
Jewish communities in the United States
Jews and Judaism in Denver
Lithuanian-Jewish culture in the United States
Orthodox Jewish communities